Murshidabad Institute of Technology, established in 1956,  is a government polytechnic college located in Cossimbazar, Berhampore,  Murshidabad district, West Bengal.

About
The college is affiliated to the West Bengal State Council of Technical Education, and recognised by the All India Council for Technical Education.

It offers diploma courses in 
Electronics and Instrumentation Engineering
Electrical Engineering
Mechanical Engineering
Civil Engineering 
&
Agricultural Engineering.

See also

References

External links
 Admission to Polytechnics in West Bengal for Academic Session 2006-2007
Official website WBSCTE

Universities and colleges in Murshidabad district
Educational institutions established in 1956
1956 establishments in West Bengal
Technical universities and colleges in West Bengal